Jerzy Nieć (born 30 June 1964) is a Polish wrestler. He competed in the men's freestyle 90 kg at the 1988 Summer Olympics.

References

External links
 

1964 births
Living people
Polish male sport wrestlers
Olympic wrestlers of Poland
Wrestlers at the 1988 Summer Olympics
People from Kraśnik
Sportspeople from Lublin Voivodeship